Namibia competed at the 2018 Commonwealth Games in the Gold Coast, Australia from April 4 to April 15, 2018.

The Namibian team consisted of 30 (20 men and 10 women) athletes competing in seven sports.

Para track and field athlete Ananias Shikongo was the country's flag bearer during the opening ceremony.

Medalists

Competitors
The following is the list of number of competitors participating at the Games per sport/discipline.

Athletics

Men
Track & road events

Field events

Women
Track & road events

Boxing

Namibia participated with a team of 3 athletes (3 men)

Men

Cycling

Namibia participated with 6 athletes (4 men and 2 women).

Road
Men

Women

Mountain bike

Gymnastics

Artistic
Namibia participated with 1 athlete (1 man).

Men
Individual Qualification

Lawn bowls

Namibia will compete in Lawn bowls.
 
Men

Women

Triathlon

Namibia participated with 1 athlete (1 man).

Individual

See also
Namibia at the 2018 Summer Youth Olympics

References

Nations at the 2018 Commonwealth Games
Namibia at the Commonwealth Games
Com